Sheldon Brown may refer to:

 Sheldon Brown (artist) (born 1962), American artist and professor of computer art
 Sheldon Brown (American football) (born 1979), American football player
 Sheldon Brown (bicycle mechanic) (1944–2008), American bicycle mechanic, writer, and webmaster